Henry Dudley Ryder (21 July 1777 – 31 March 1836) was a prominent English evangelical Anglican bishop in the early years of the nineteenth century. He was the first evangelical to be raised to the Anglican episcopate.

Life
Ryder was the fifth son of Nathaniel Ryder, 1st Baron Harrowby, by his wife Elizabeth Terrick, daughter of Richard Terrick, Bishop of London. Dudley Ryder, 1st Earl of Harrowby and the Honourable Richard Ryder were his elder brothers. He studied at St John's College, Cambridge, and became vicar of Lutterworth and of Claybrook. He was canon of Windsor in 1808.

He was successively Bishop of Gloucester, from 1815, and Bishop of Lichfield and Coventry, from 1824. His kneeling statue by Francis Legatt Chantrey is in Lichfield Cathedral.

John Henry Newman, in his Apologia Pro Vita Sua, speaks of the veneration in which he held Ryder.

Family
Ryder married Sophia, daughter of Thomas March Phillips, in 1802. Their second son George Dudley Ryder was the father of the Very Reverend Henry Ignatius Dudley Ryder. Their fifth son was Admiral of the Fleet Sir Alfred Phillips Ryder. Their sixth and youngest son Spencer Ryder was the ancestor of the soldier and politician Robert Ryder. Ryder died in March 1836, aged 58. His wife died in August 1862.

Gallery

References

Sources

Attribution

1777 births
1836 deaths
Younger sons of barons
Bishops of Gloucester
Deans of Wells
Canons of Windsor
Canons of Westminster
Henry
Alumni of St John's College, Cambridge
Evangelical Anglican bishops